Ulrik Cappelen (né Christensen) (born March 28, 1964), known as Ulrik Moseby, is a Danish former association football player in the midfielder position. Born in Odense, he played 338 games for Odense Boldklub, winning the 1982 and 1989 Danish championships with the club. He scored two goals in 10 games for the Denmark national football team, and also represented the Denmark national under-21 football team.

References

External links
Danish national team profile
Danish Superliga statistics
Most capped Odense Boldklub players
Haslund.info profile

1964 births
Living people
Footballers from Odense
Danish men's footballers
Odense Boldklub players
Danish Superliga players
Denmark under-21 international footballers
Denmark international footballers
Association football midfielders